The women's 'Hard Styles' category involved fifteen contestants from ten countries across three continents – Europe, Africa and North America.  Each contestant went through seven performances (2 minutes each) with the totals added up at the end of the event.  The gold medal went to Great Britain's Jessica Holmes, the silver and bronze to Russians Olga Kudinova and Elena Chirkova respectively.  Chirkova would also win a silver medal in the women's 'Hard Styles with Weapons' category.

Results

See also
List of WAKO Amateur World Championships
List of WAKO Amateur European Championships
List of female kickboxers

References

External links
 WAKO World Association of Kickboxing Organizations Official Site

Kickboxing events at the WAKO World Championships 2007 Coimbra
2007 in kickboxing
Kickboxing in Portugal